Neath South is an electoral ward of Neath Port Talbot county borough, Wales falling in the community of Neath.

Neath South consists of some or all of the settlements of Cimla and Mount Pleasant in the parliamentary constituency of Neath.  It is bounded by  the wards of Neath East to the west; Neath North to the north; and Cimla to the east.

Election results
In the 2012 local council elections, the electorate turnout was 31.14%.  The results were:

Malcolm Gunter died following the election; a by-election was held on 6 December 2012 to fill the vacant seat. With a 14.5% turnout, the result was:

In the 2017 local council elections, the results were:

References 

Electoral wards of Neath Port Talbot
Neath